Zayn Mohammed Junayd Hakeem (born 15 February 1999) is a British-born Antiguan footballer who plays for Shepshed Dynamo, where he plays as a forward.

Early life
Hakeem attended The Martin High School, Anstey, Leicestershire starting in 2012.

Playing career

Mansfield Town
Hakeem began his career with Mansfield Town and made his professional debut on 7 May 2016 in a 0–0 draw against Cambridge United.

Coalville Town (loan)
Zayn joined Southern League Premier Central side Coalville Town on loan on 13 October 2018, on a deal that ran until 1 January 2019.

Bradford (Park Avenue)
Zayn signed for National League North side Bradford (Park Avenue) on 30 July 2019 following his release from Mansfield Town.

Barwell
Hakeem joined Southern League Premier Division Central side Barwell for the 2019–20 season in September 2019. He made his Southern League Premier Division Central debut on 28 September 2019 coming on as a 70th minute substitute for Tolani Omotola, in a 3–1 away defeat at Nuneaton Borough.

Zayn scored his first Southern League Premier Division Central goal for Barwell on 21 December 2019, in an away fixture against Peterborough Sports, again coming on as a 70th minute substitute for Tolani Omotola, Hakeem scored the equaliser on the 73rd minute to make it 4–4, only for Dan Lawlor to score an 80th-minute winner for Peterborough Sports.

Coleshill Town
Zayn signed for Southern League Division One Central side Coleshill Town on 23 January 2020. He made his Southern League Division One Central debut the following day in a home fixture against Aylesbury United, it wasn't one to remember with his new team succumbing to a 6–0 home defeat.

Northern Premier League
In July 2021, he signed for Northern Premier League Division One East side Worksop Town, following a curtailed season at Anstey Nomads in the previous campaign in the United Counties League. In October 2021, he was on the move again to divisional rivals Stamford. He returned to Anstey Nomads in January 2022, as he had found his game time limited at Stamford. Hakeem made the move back to the NPL, signing for Shepshed Dynamo at the beginning of the 2022-23 season.

International career
Hakeem has represented Antigua and Barbuda U-20s. He scored twice against Bermuda in the 2017 CONCACAF U-20 Championship qualifying tournament.

Career statistics

Club

References

External links

1999 births
People from Leicester
Living people
Antigua and Barbuda footballers
English footballers
English sportspeople of Antigua and Barbuda descent
English Football League players
Southern Football League players
Northern Premier League players
Mansfield Town F.C. players
Grantham Town F.C. players
Basford United F.C. players
Coalville Town F.C. players
Bradford (Park Avenue) A.F.C. players
Barwell F.C. players
Coleshill Town F.C. players
Worksop Town F.C. players
Stamford A.F.C. players
Anstey Nomads F.C. players
Association football forwards
Antigua and Barbuda under-20 international footballers